Basab Mitra, popularly known by his stage name Kunal Mitra, was an Indian actor who appeared in Bengali films and television.

Early life  
Kunal Mitra was an Indian film actor who has performed in Bengali movies and TV shows. He was recognized as Councilor Janardan Jana from the famous television show Raja & Goja: Bindass Moja Zee Bangla. He played the role of councilor of Ward no. 420; his conclusive movie was Chhaw-a Chhuti. Kunal was born in Kolkata, West Bengal, India. He was the grandchild of the famous movie maker Debaki Kumar Bose and son of Mr.Basab Mitra, and Mrs. Mitra Kunal has two children Gaurab, and Deborah. He was married to Ruma Mitra in 1992, and they have two children Gaurab and Deborshi.

Career
Mitra began his career in television with the comedy serial Ebar Jombe Mawja on 1994. He appeared in about 300 shows and serials, and around ten feature films.
He achieved success as Councilor Janardan Jana in the popular show Raja & Goja: Bindass Moja on the Zee Bangla television channel, where he played a councilor of Ward no. 420 who performed many anti-social activities. His last film was Chhaw-a Chhuti.

Death 
Mitra died of a heart attack while shooting at Indrapuri Studio, Kolkata for the television serial “Utsaver Ratri,” directed by Jishu Sengupta.He was survived by his wife and two sons.

Filmography 
Raaj Bangsha (2009)
Chhaye Chuti (2009)
Sedin Dujone (2008)
Lal Ronger Duniya (2008)
Rangamati (2008)
Krishnakanter Will (2007)
Bibar (2006)
Alo (2003)
Sampradan
Raja & Goja: Bindaas Moja (TV series)
Kaler Rakhal
Shukno Lanka
Jahangirer Swarnamudra (1998)

References

External links 
 

1965 births
2009 deaths
Bengali male actors
Male actors in Bengali cinema
University of Calcutta alumni
21st-century Indian male actors
Male actors from Kolkata